Aluminium in Africa originates from bauxite, and within Africa is primarily found in Guinea, Mozambique and Ghana. Guinea is by far the biggest producer in Africa, and is a world leader in bauxite production.

There are many companies involved in the aluminium trade in Africa. Principal mine and smelter operators include:

Cameroon 

 Ngaoundéré - railhead
 Minim, Martap - Canyon Resources

Ghana 
 Ghana Bauxite, affiliated with Alcan
 Volta Aluminum Company (Valco)

Guinea 
 Rio Tinto Alcan
 Compagnie des Bauxites de Guinée (CBG) - in the Boké Region - Guinea's largest producer, affiliated with Halco Mining, which is affiliated with Alcan, Alcoa, Reynolds Metals, Pechiney, Comalco, etc.
 Alumina Company of Guinea, ACG - operating the Friguia bauxite-alumina complex at Fria
 Societé des Bauxites de Kindia SBK - state-owned, operates the Kindia mining operations; operated by Rusal (Russia Aluminium) and exports bauxite to Ukraine
 Global Alumina Products Corporation, proposed smelting operation in Conakry
 Kinia - refinery 
 Sangaredi
 There are over 100 Guinean aluminium companies listed at MBendi's Bauxite:Africa:Guinea information page.

Mozambique 
 Mozal - Mozambique aluminium

South Africa 
 South Africa does not mine bauxite nor refine alumina; BHP operates two smelters at Richards Bay in Kwazulu Natal.

See also 
 Mining
 Copper in Africa
 Iron ore in Africa
 Platinum in Africa
 Titanium in Africa
 Uranium in Africa
 List of Alumina Refineries

References

External links 
 MBendi:Mining:Bauxite:Africa
 MBendi:Mining:Bauxite:Africa:Guinea
 Alcan't in South Africa

 
Economy of Africa
Mining in Africa
Bauxite mining